Tamil Nadu State Highway 30 (SH-30) is a State Highway maintained by the Highways Department of the Government of Tamil Nadu. It connects Musiri with Attur in the northwestern part of Tamil Nadu.

Route
The route is from MusiriAttur, via Thuraiyur.

See also 
 Highways of Tamil Nadu

References 

State highways in Tamil Nadu
Road transport in Tiruchirappalli